La Grandiosa Bertita (The Grandiose Berta), is a Chilean fonda that is installed during the Fiestas Patrias in the O'Higgins Park in Santiago, Chile.

This fonda runs roughly from 1958, and since 1979 is installed in the O'Higgins Park, making it one of the oldest fondas of Santiago.

References

Public holidays in Chile
Fiestas Patrias (Mexico)